Arampampa Airport  is a high-elevation airport serving the village of Arampampa in the Potosí Department of Bolivia. Both airport and village are on an irregular mesa in mountainous terrain.

See also

Transport in Bolivia
List of airports in Bolivia

References

External links
OpenStreetMap - Arampampa
OurAirports - Arampampa

Airports in Potosí Department